Sephus is a surname. Notable people with the surname include:

 John Sephus Mack (1880–1940), American businessperson and philanthropist
 Nashlie Sephus, American computer engineer and entrepreneur